Cristian Damián Torres (born 18 June 1985) is a professional football player who currently plays for Liepāja. Born in Argentina, he plays for the Latvia national team.

Career

Club
During the summer of 2012, Torres moved from Gabala to Ravan Baku. 18-months later, Torres signed for Qarabağ for six-months re-signing with Ravan Baku in the summer of 2013.

In March 2014, Torres signed for Liepāja.

International

Career statistics

Club

International

Statistics accurate as of match played 9 June 2018

Honours
Liepāja
Latvian Higher League (1): 2015

References

External links

1985 births
Living people
Latvian footballers
Latvia international footballers
Argentine footballers
Latvian people of Argentine descent
Argentine emigrants to Latvia
Azerbaijan Premier League players
Latvian Higher League players
Gabala FC players
Qarabağ FK players
FK Liepāja players
Argentine expatriate footballers
Expatriate footballers in Azerbaijan
Association football midfielders
Argentine expatriate sportspeople in Azerbaijan
People from Vicente López Partido
Sportspeople from Buenos Aires Province